Dharam Pal Choudhary (1953/1954 – 19 April 2018) was an Indian politician from the Bharatiya Janata Party and a member of the Rajasthan Legislative Assembly representing the Mundawar Vidhan Sabha constituency of Rajasthan. He died on 19 April 2018 from a liver disease.

References 

1950s births
2018 deaths
Bharatiya Janata Party politicians from Rajasthan
Rajasthan MLAs 2013–2018
People from Alwar district
Year of birth missing